John William Wright Patman (August 6, 1893 – March 7, 1976) was an American politician. First elected in 1928, Patman served 24 consecutive terms in the United States House of Representatives for Texas's 1st congressional district from 1929 to 1976. He was a member of the Democratic Party. From 1973 to 1976, he was Dean of the United States House of Representatives.

Patman grew up in Hughes Springs, Texas. After graduating from Cumberland University, Patman returned to Hughes Springs to be a lawyer. From 1916 to 1917, Patman held his first political office as assistant county attorney for Cass County, Texas. He then served in the United States Army during World War I from 1917 to 1919. After the war, Patman was elected to the Texas House of Representatives in 1920. Patman served two terms in the Texas House before serving as a district attorney in Texas from 1924 to 1929.

In Congress, Patman was a fiscal watchdog who challenged practices of major banks and the Federal Reserve. He co-sponsored the Robinson-Patman Act of 1935, which was designed to protect small retail shops against competition from chain stores by fixing a minimum price for retail products. From 1963 to 1975, Patman chaired the United States House Committee on Banking and Currency. Patman served in Congress until his death in 1976. His son Bill Patman later served in a different U.S. House seat in Texas from 1981 to 1985.

Early life
Patman was the son of John N. and Emma (Spurlin) Patman, was born near Hughes Springs in Cass County, Texas, on August 6, 1893. After graduating from Hughes Springs High School in 1912, he enrolled in Cumberland University Law School in Lebanon, Tennessee. Receiving his law degree in 1916 he was admitted to the Texas bar the same year.  During World War I Patman enlisted in the United States Army as a private.  He later received a commission as a first lieutenant and machine gun officer in the Texas Army National Guard's 144th Infantry Regiment, a unit of the 36th Division.  He remained in the National Guard for several years after the war.

Political career

Early political career
Patman was elected to the Texas House of Representatives in 1920. He left the House in 1924 when he was appointed district attorney of the fifth judicial district of Texas.

Early Congressional career

In 1928, Patman was elected to the House of Representatives from Texas's 1st congressional district. In 1932, Patman introduced a bill that would have mandated the immediate payment of the bonus to World War I veterans. It was during the consideration of this bill that the Bonus Army came to Washington. Patman was a supporter of the New Deal.

In January 1932, Patman spearheaded a movement to impeach Treasury Secretary Andrew Mellon, which forced the latter's resignation the following month.

In 1935, Patman took on the cause of independent retailers, who were engaged in a nationwide battle to stop the growth of chain retailing by taxing chains and restricting their business practices. Patman in the House and Joseph Taylor Robinson in the United States Senate were the sponsors of the 1936 Robinson-Patman Act, an effort to preserve independent wholesalers and retail outlets ("Mom and Pop stores") by preventing manufacturers or large retailers from becoming involved in wholesaling.

Patman was one of four members of the Texas congressional delegation to originally sign the "Southern Manifesto," (Martin Dies Jr. signed subsequently) a resolution in protest of the United States Supreme Court decision in Brown v. Board of Education.

Watergate inquiry

Wright Patman's eponymous committee played an important role in the early days of the Watergate scandal that eventually brought down the Nixon Administration.

The Patman Committee investigated the hundred dollar bills found on the Watergate "plumbers" upon their arrest, suspecting they could directly link them to CREEP, the president's re-election committee. The Patman Committee's 1972 investigation was stymied by pressure from the White House, in part aided by Congressman Gerald R. Ford. Despite these efforts to stop Patman, his investigative course ultimately proved to be Nixon's undoing in the sense that the money trail, as reported on in The Washington Post, helped lead to the establishment of the Ervin Senate Select Committee on Watergate in April 1973.

Loss of chairmanship
In 1975, Patman was voted out of his position as Chairman of the Banking committee by younger Congressmen, in a revolt against the 'Seniority system' which also removed Felix Edward Hébert and William R. Poage from their positions as chairmen. Patman was replaced by Henry S. Reuss by a caucus vote of 152–117. The main reason given for the caucus removing Patman was concern about his age and effectiveness.

Personal life
In 1919, Patman married Merle Connor, who died in 1967. They had four children, including Bill Patman, who served in the U.S. House from 1981 to 1985. Wright Patman remarried in 1968 to Pauline Tucker.

Patman died of pneumonia in Bethesda, Maryland on March 7, 1976.  He was buried at Hillcrest Cemetery in Texarkana. "His funeral in Texarkana was one of the largest, most important occurrences in the town's history," wrote Mark Stanley in a 2004 essay for the East Texas Historical Journal.

Legacy
Patman is regarded as a liberal and populist who brought federal jobs and works projects to his district, where agriculture previously was the dominant economic sector. However, the left wing Americans for Democratic Action scored Patman low in its 100-point "liberal quotient" (LQ) scale, at 13 in 1972 and 24 in 1973. In contrast, the American Conservative Union rated Patman a more favorable 47 out of 100 in 1973.

In the U.S. House of Representatives in Washington, the Wright Patman Congressional Federal Credit Union is named after him. This credit union serves the banking needs of elected and former members of the House and their staff. In addition, Wright Patman Lake and Wright Patman Dam in Northeast Texas are also named for him.

In fiction

Wright Patman is the Governor of Texas in the alternate history novel Settling Accounts: In at the Death by Harry Turtledove, part of the TL-191 series.

Publications
Tax Exempt Foundations and Charitable Trusts: Their Impact on Our Economy (December 1962) 87th Congress, 2nd Session
Commercial Banks and Their Trust Activities: Emerging Influence on the American Economy (Washington DC 1968) 90th Congress, 2nd Session, volumes I and II

See also
 List of United States Congress members who died in office (1950–99)

Notes

Further reading

 Schwarz, Jordan A. The New Dealers: Power politics in the age of Roosevelt (Vintage, 2011) pp 285–296. online

External links

Texas A&M University Press: Wright Patman: Populism, Liberalism, and the American Dream by Nancy Beck Young
 

1893 births
1976 deaths
Democratic Party members of the Texas House of Representatives
Cumberland School of Law alumni
People from Hughes Springs, Texas
Texas lawyers
Democratic Party members of the United States House of Representatives from Texas
Deaths from pneumonia in Maryland
Watergate scandal investigators
Military personnel from Texas
United States Army officers
Texas National Guard personnel
Deans of the United States House of Representatives
United States Army personnel of World War I